Paolo Cajatia (1573–1638) was a Roman Catholic prelate who served as Bishop of Ariano (1624–1638).

Biography
Paolo Cajatia was born in 1573.
On 15 Apr 1624, he was appointed during the papacy of Pope Urban VIII as Bishop of Ariano.
He served as Bishop of Ariano until his death in Mar 1638.

References

External links and additional sources
 (for Chronology of Bishops) 
 (for Chronology of Bishops) 

17th-century Italian Roman Catholic bishops
Bishops appointed by Pope Urban VIII
Bishops of Ariano
1573 births
1638 deaths